Deaf Smith County is a county located in the U.S. state of Texas. As of the 2020 census, the population was 18,583. The county seat is Hereford, which is known as the "Beef Capital of the World". The county was created in 1876 and later organized in 1890.

The Hereford, TX Micropolitan Statistical Area includes all of Deaf Smith County.

History
In 1876, the state legislature defined and named the county, but it was not organized until 1890, with the town of La Plata as the original county seat. The county was named for Erastus "Deaf" Smith (1787–1837), a partially deaf scout and soldier who served in the Texas Revolution, and was the first to reach the Alamo after its fall in 1836.

Geography

Major highways
  Interstate 40
  U.S. Highway 60
  U.S. Highway 385
  State Highway 214

Adjacent counties
Oldham County (north)
Potter County (northeast)
Randall County (east)
Castro County (southeast)
Parmer County (south)
Curry County, New Mexico (southwest/Mountain Time Zone)
Quay County, New Mexico (west/Mountain Time Zone)

Demographics

Note: the US Census treats Hispanic/Latino as an ethnic category. This table excludes Latinos from the racial categories and assigns them to a separate category. Hispanics/Latinos can be of any race.

As of the census of 2000, 18,561 people, 6,180 households, and 4,832 families resided in the county.  The population density was 12 people/sq mi (5/km2).  The 6,914 housing units averaged 5,sq mi (2/km2).  The racial makeup of the county was 72.28% White, 1.51% African American, 0.80% Native American, 0.25% Asian, 0.13% Pacific Islander, 22.92% from other races, and 2.11% from two or more races.  About 57.40% of the population was Hispanic or Latino of any race.

Of the 6,180 households, 41.00% had children under  18 living with them, 61.00% were married couples living together, 12.60% had a female householder with no husband present, and 21.80% were not families. Around 19.70% of all households was made up of individuals, and 10.00% had someone living alone who was 65 years of age or older.  The average household size was 2.96 and the average family size was 3.41.

In the county, the age distribution was  33.30% under 18, 9.60% from 18 to 24, 25.50% from 25 to 44, 19.40% from 45 to 64, and 12.10% who were 65 or older.  The median age was 31 years. For every 100 females, there were 95.50 males.  For every 100 females age 18 and over, there were 91.90 males.

The median income for a household was $29,601, and for a family was $32,391. Males had a median income of $26,090 versus $19,113 for females. The per capita income for the county was $13,119.  About 19.30% of families and 20.60% of the population were below the poverty line, including 26.30% of those under age 18 and 15.70% of those age 65 or over.

Infrastructure
The headquarters of the Deaf Smith Electric Cooperative are located in Hereford. The cooperative provides electricity for Deaf Smith, as well as Castro, Parmer, and Oldham Counties.

Communities

City
Hereford (county seat)

Unincorporated communities
Dawn
Glenrio (partly in Quay County, New Mexico), Bredmansburg

Politics
Deaf Smith County was the most Hispanic county or equivalent to vote for Donald Trump in the 2016 presidential election.

Education
School districts:
 Adrian Independent School District
 Friona Independent School District
 Hereford Independent School District
 Vega Independent School District
 Walcott Independent School District
 Wildorado Independent School District

All of the county is in the service area of Amarillo College.

See also

List of museums in the Texas Panhandle
Margaret Clark Formby
*National Register of Historic Places listings in Deaf Smith County, Texas
Recorded Texas Historic Landmarks in Deaf Smith County

References

External links
Deaf Smith County government website
A History of Deaf Smith County, featuring Pioneer Families, published 1964 by Bessie Smith, hosted by the Portal to Texas History
The Land and Its People, 1876-1981: Deaf Smith County Texas, published 1982 by the Deaf Smith County Historical society, hosted by the Portal to Texas History
Historic photographs from the Deaf Smith County Library hosted by the Portal to Texas History
Deaf Smith County in Handbook of Texas Online at the University of Texas
Deaf Smith County Profile from the Texas Association of Counties

 
1890 establishments in Texas
Populated places established in 1890
Texas Panhandle
Majority-minority counties in Texas